Geo Entertainment HD or Geo Drama is a Pakistani entertainment television channel owned by Geo Television Network was established in May 2002. Its test transmission started on 14 August 2002 on the PAS 10 digital satellite whereas on 1 October 2002 the regular transmission of Geo Entertainment was started.

History 
GEO has been one of the oldest Pakistani networks, and regularly has received good TRPs on various daily soaps, reality series, and drama serials since inception. Geo used to show a lot of daily soaps when it was in its initial years and the soaps got popular too. Some shows from the 2000s that aired on the network which are still recognized include Tere Pehlu Main, Meri Zaat Zarra-e-Benishan, Kaash Main Teri Beti Na Hoti, Tum Ho Kay Chup, Doraha, and various more. The channel continued to do well in ratings but in 2014 the network was banned in the country for promoting blasphemy on its morning show Utho Jago Pakistan. The channel was eventually unbanned but the ratings took a hit and the channel was panned for making below average content, and it took a while for the channel to get back onto the charts with well ratings. In 2017, GEO launched Khaani and the series went on to become a huge success for the network with worldwide success and was later added on Netflix due to its major popularity. Similarly around the same time Ghar Titli Ka Par also was a big success for the network domestically and garnered many views on YouTube as well. The two drama serials helped GEO break ground just like it did before its ban and become the most viewed channel in Pakistan. Since that time, Geo joined hands with 7th Sky Entertainment and has produced various shows that have been record-breaking on television and social media platforms. In 2019, the network created two records for the most watched show in the 9:00 pm slot with the beginning of Bharosa Pyar Tera and ending of Dil-e-Gumshuda , both the series garnered 17.0 TRP In 2020, Munafiq created a record for the most watched show in the 7:00 pm slot with 22.75 TRP, and is also the second highest rated serial in the history of Pakistani television, as well as being in the top trending list in India on YouTube. In recent times, criticism of Geo Entertainment includes the flak for its low picture quality on television compared to HUM HD and ARY Digital which are in higher quality, and making very Indian-ized dramas by copying daily soaps from Indian networks and turning them into weekly drama serials or daily soaps as well in order to get ratings. Popular programming which have gotten ratings as well as international popularity in recent years includes , Mohabbat Tumse Nafrat Hai, Piya Naam Ka Diya, Ramz-e-Ishq, Yaariyan, Meharposh, Aye Dil Tu Bata, Deewangi, Kahin Deep Jalay , Rang Mahal and many more. The network also has various series on Amazon Prime Video such as Hiddat and Yaar-e-Bewafa.

SD Feed Shutdown
Since June 2021, the Geo Entertainment is available in HD along with the sister channels of the network.

Programming

Controversy

Banned by PEMRA
In May 2014, Geo Entertainment was banned by PEMRA for airing blasphemous content in its morning show Utho Jago Pakistan. Protest was also done in Lahore as people said it is an unlawful ban. While on other hand countrywide protest was done against Geo for airing controversial content.

References

External links
Official website

Television channels and stations established in 2002
2002 establishments in Pakistan
Geo TV
Television stations in Karachi